Mount Polis is a  mountain peak located on the borders of the provinces of Ifugao and Mountain Province in the Philippines. It ranks as the third highest mountain in Ifugao province and the 124th highest mountain in Philippines.

In December 1899, Emilio Aguinaldo, President of the First Philippine Republic, passed through a pass on the mountain en route from Tirad Pass to Abra province while fleeing American forces during the Philippine–American War.

References

Polis
Landforms of Ifugao
Landforms of Mountain Province